Hayley Williams (born 1988) is an American singer and musician, best known as the frontwoman of the band Paramore.

Hayley Williams may also refer to:

 Hayley J Williams, a British actress
 Hayley Williams (ice hockey) (born 1990), an American professional ice hockey player

See also
 William Hayley (1745–1820), an 18th and 19th-century English biographer